Jeremy Daniel Knowles (born 30 August 1981 in Nassau) is a 3-time Olympic and Bahamian-Record-holding swimmer from The Bahamas.

He was the Bahamas flag-bearer at the 2007 Pan American Games.

International tournaments
1997 Short Course Worlds
1999 Pan Am Games
2000 Olympics
2003 Summer Universiade
2003 Pan Am Games
2004 Olympics
2006 Commonwealth Games
2007 World Championships
2007 Pan Am Games
2008 Olympics

References

1981 births
Sportspeople from Nassau, Bahamas
Bahamian male swimmers
Auburn Tigers men's swimmers
Bahamian people of British descent
Swimmers at the 1999 Pan American Games
Swimmers at the 2000 Summer Olympics
Swimmers at the 2003 Pan American Games
Swimmers at the 2004 Summer Olympics
Swimmers at the 2006 Commonwealth Games
Swimmers at the 2007 Pan American Games
Swimmers at the 2008 Summer Olympics
Living people
Olympic swimmers of the Bahamas
Pan American Games competitors for the Bahamas
Commonwealth Games competitors for the Bahamas
Universiade medalists in swimming
Central American and Caribbean Games silver medalists for the Bahamas
Central American and Caribbean Games bronze medalists for the Bahamas
Competitors at the 2006 Central American and Caribbean Games
Universiade medalists for the Bahamas
Central American and Caribbean Games medalists in swimming
Medalists at the 2003 Summer Universiade